Boerhavia elegans is a species of flowering plants in the four o'clock flower family, Nyctaginaceae.

It is one of the species that compose the "tortoise turf", the food source of the Aldabra giant tortoise, of the Aldabra Atoll in the Seychelles.

References

External links 

 Boerhavia elegans at the International Plant Names Index (IPNI)
 Boerhavia elegans at Tropicos

elegans
Plants described in 1849
Flora of Seychelles
Nyctaginaceae
Taxa named by Jacques Denys Choisy